Callicebus is a genus of monkeys known as titi monkeys.

Historically, titis were monogeneric, comprising only the genus Callicebus Thomas, 1903. Owing to the great diversity found across titi monkey species, a new genus-level taxonomy was recently proposed that recognises three genera within the subfamily Callicebinae; Cheracebus Byrne et al., 2016 for the species of the torquatus group (Widow titis); Plecturocebus Byrne et al., 2016 for the Amazonian and Chaco titis of the moloch and donacophilus groups; and Callicebus Thomas, 1903 sensu stricto, for species of the Atlantic Forest personatus group.

In 2014, a previously unknown orange Callicebus was spotted in the Peruvian Amazon; it has not been determined whether this constitutes a color variant or a new species.

Species
There are 5 species in this genus:
Barbara Brown's titi monkey, Callicebus barbarabrownae
 Coimbra Filho's titi monkey, Callicebus coimbrai
 Coastal black-handed titi monkey, Callicebus melanochir
 Black-fronted titi monkey, Callicebus nigrifrons
 Atlantic titi monkey, Callicebus personatus

References

 
Primate genera
Taxa named by Oldfield Thomas
Taxa described in 1903